Ruslan Vasylkyv (born 8 January 1973) is a retired Ukrainian football defender.

References

1973 births
Living people
Ukrainian footballers
SC Odesa players
FC Chornomorets Odesa players
MFC Mykolaiv players
FC Frunzenets-Liha-99 Sumy players
FC Obolon-Brovar Kyiv players
Association football defenders